

The Naval Air Establishment Chiang Hung (江鴻 - "River Swan") was a reconnaissance seaplane developed for the Chinese Navy in the late 1920s. It was a conventional biplane design with single-bay, unstaggered wings of equal span and accommodation for the pilot and observer in tandem, open cockpits. The landing gear consisted of twin pontoons.

Operators

Chinese Navy

Specifications

References

Further reading
 
 

1920s Chinese military reconnaissance aircraft
Floatplanes
Biplanes
Single-engined tractor aircraft
Chiang Hung